The Swinging Blue Jeans are a four-piece 1960s British Merseybeat band, best known for their hit singles with the HMV label: "Hippy Hippy Shake", "Good Golly Miss Molly", and "You're No Good", issued in 1964. Subsequent singles released that year and the next made no impression. In 1966, their version of Burt Bacharach and Hal David's "Don't Make Me Over" peaked at no. 31 in the UK Singles Chart, but the group never charted again.

Career
The group had its origins in 1957, when Bruce McCaskill formed a jazz-influenced skiffle sextet called the Bluegenes. Besides guitarist/vocalist McCaskill, the original line-up also included banjo player Tommy Hughes, washboard player Norman Kuhlke, and oil drum bass player Spud Ward. There were a number of early personnel changes, as guitarist Ralph Ellis joined the band and Ward was replaced by Les Braid. Johnny Carter and Paul Moss entered the band to replace Hughes and McCaskill. They were a fully working band by 1962, playing skiffle at venues in Liverpool and at the Star Club in Hamburg. The German audiences booed them off the stage, however, and the group rapidly changed direction and focus. They switched to rock and roll, and with a name change to reflect their attire, to the Swinging Blue Jeans. This earned the band, then a quintet featuring Ennis, Braid, Ellis, Kuhlke and Moss, a recording contract with HMV with record producer, Walter Ridley. The quintet's first recording, "It's Too Late Now", which was written by Ennis, made the British Top 30. After the departure of Moss, the band became a quartet. In December 1963, a cover of the song "Hippy Hippy Shake" took the band to Number two on the British charts and established them as stars.

They had a three-year spell of success, rising and falling with Merseybeat itself. The Swinging Blue Jeans had the standard Shadows line-up of two guitars, a bass guitar and drums and achieved local fame with their appearances at the Mardi Gras Club and the Cavern Club.

An album Blue Jeans a-Swinging was released in 1964 by HMV; a contemporaneous American LP composed of 45 and EP tracks, Hippy Hippy Shake included the released-in-the-US-only instrumental, "Wasting Time".

In early 1966, Terry Sylvester from The Escorts replaced Ellis, who had shared songwriting duties with Ray Ennis. The band drifted into a middle of the road direction which failed to bring them any success. In 1967, the band's producer Ridley decided to try and transform Ennis into a solo star, cutting the disc "Tremblin'" with session musicians and backing vocals by Madeline Bell and Kiki Dee, but it was ultimately released under the band's name. Also in that year the band went to a five piece unit with the introduction of another member from The Escorts, bass player Mike Gregory, with Braid moving on to keyboards. Sylvester left at the end of 1968 to replace Graham Nash in The Hollies. The band eventually retired to the cabaret circuit.

Early in 1999, Alan Lovell deputised for guitarist Colin Manley due to his deteriorating health. Manley died in April 1999 and Lovell became a permanent member of the band as lead guitarist/vocalist. When Les Braid died in 2005, Peter Oakman took over on bass guitar/vocals.
   
At the end of The Solid Silver Sixties tour in May 2010, Ray Ennis officially retired, announcing his retirement on radio and to the general public. During and prior to the tour, Ennis offered Lovell the opportunity to continue with the band under the name "The Swinging Blue Jeans". Initially Lovell declined but subsequently registered the trademark of the name "The Swinging Blue Jeans" without Ray Ennis's knowledge. Phil Thompson (drums) was unable to continue with band due to personal reasons so, in June 2010, two new musicians joined, Graham Hollingworth (drums) and Jeff Bannister (keyboards/vocals).

Ennis then decided to challenge Lovell for the ownership of the trademark but a Court decision ruled that Lovell had exclusive legal rights to the name. A subsequent appeal was lodged but was also dismissed. Meanwhile, Ennis came out of retirement to make occasional appearances with another band under the name "Ray Ennis's Blue Jeans". 

The Swinging Blue Jeans continue to perform today, with no original members, under the leadership of Lovell.

Band members
Ray Ennis – Vocalist / lead guitarist – born Raymond Vincent Ennis, 26 May 1940, Huyton, Liverpool – 1957 – 2010
Les Braid – Bassist / keyboardist – born William Leslie Braid, 15 September 1937, West Derby Road, West Derby, Liverpool – died 31 July 2005, Fazakerley Hospital, Fazakerley, Liverpool – 1957–2005
Norman Kuhlke – Drummer – born 17 June 1942, Liverpool – 1957 – 1969
Ralph Ellis – Guitarist/vocalist – born 8 March 1942, Liverpool – 1958–1966
Norman Houghton – Washboard – born 18 September 1940, Liverpool – 1957
Jimmy Hudson – Double bass – 1957–1958
Kenneth Metcalf – Lead vocalist, guitar – 1957
Arthur Griffiths – Guitarist – 1957
Tommy Hughes – Banjo – 1958–1959 – born 7 May 1938 – died 21 September 2013
Paul Moss – Banjo – 1959–1963 - born 1942 
John E. Carter – Singer, guitarist – born 21 May 1938, Liverpool. Carter came from HyKatz Skiffle Group in 1959, before leaving for Canada in June 1961.
Terry Sylvester – Singer, guitarist – born 8 January 1946, Allerton, Liverpool. Sylvester came from The Escorts in Feb 1966, before leaving to replace Graham Nash in The Hollies in December 1969.
Colin Manley – Lead Guitarist – born Colin William Manley, 16 April 1942, Old Swan, Liverpool – died 9 April 1999 - member from 1977 to 1999 
John Ryan – Drummer – born 5 April 1953, Pinehurst Avenue, Liverpool – 1980–1983
Bruce McCaskill – Guitarist / vocalist – born Bruce Thomas McCaskill, 15 January 1940, Liverpool died 24 December 1993, Los Angeles, California – 1957–1959
Mike Gregory – Bass guitarist – born Michael Gregory, 7 November 1946, Liverpool Maternity Hospital, Liverpool – 1967–1972
Michael Pynn – 1972–1975 lead guitar, vocals, recorded two albums & toured Scandinavia
Kenny Goodlass – Drummer – Liverpool
Jim Rodford – Bass guitarist – born 7 July 1941, St Albans - died January 20, 2018
Keith Dodd - lead guitar former member of Ricky Gleason and the Topspots, he can be seen playing with them on Wheeltappers and Shunters club
Phil Thompson – Drummer – born 18 October 1947, Liverpool; joined the band in 1983. Died April 2018
Hedley Vick – Guitarist – 24 April 1952, Bromborough, Merseyside; 1975/6 including tours of UK, Europe and New Zealand; brother of opera director, Graham Vick
Alan Lovell – Guitarist – born 5 January 1952, Newtown, Wales – 1999 – present incarnation 
Jeff Bannister – Keyboardist, vocalist – born Jeffrey Bannister, 7 January 1943, Slough, Berkshire
Pete Oakman – Bassist, vocalist – born Peter Andrew Oakman, 12 December 1943, Cuffley, Hertfordshire – 2010
Spud Ward – Double bassist, bass guitar, songwriter – born Albert James Ward, 2 November 1940, Walton, Liverpool – 1957–1958

Discography

Albums
Hippy Hippy Shake (1964) – US no. 90
Blue Jeans a'Swinging (1964) Hippy Hippy Shake (1964) [Capitol T 6069] Canada.
Tutti Frutti (1964) [Regal SREG 1073] Export only issue of first album
Live aus dem "Cascade Beat Club" in Köln (1965) [Electrola SME 83 927] Germany only
Don't Make Me Over (1966) [Capitol T 6159] Canada only
The Swinging Blue Jeans (1967) [MFP 1163] Reissue of first album
Hippy Hippy Shake (1973) [Grand Prix, GP 10025] Swedish label; includes tracks not available in the UK
Brand New and Faded (1974) [Dart, BULL 1001]
Jump 'n' Jeans (1979) [Mace Records, ACE 001]
Best of the Swinging Blue Jeans [NUT 15] Compilation album, 1963–67

Singles

See also
List of bands and artists from Merseyside
List of performers on Top of the Pops
List of British Invasion Artists

Notes

References

External links
Official website

Beat groups
British Invasion artists
English pop music groups
Musical groups from Liverpool
Musical groups established in 1962
Imperial Records artists
1962 establishments in England